Amenaprkich Monastery was an Armenian monastery in Gazanchy village (Julfa District) of the Nakhchivan Autonomous Republic of Azerbaijan. The monastery was located in the center of the village.

History 
The monastery was founded in the 12–13th centuries and was rebuilt in 1654, according to an Armenian inscription on a khachkar set above the lintel of the doorway.

Architecture 
In the late Soviet years, the outer walls of the monastery complex, the porch attached to the church, and other associated buildings were in ruins. It was a basilica structure consisting of a nave with two aisles, an apse and two vestries. The western facade bore an Armenian inscription while interior walls had fragments of wall painting.

Destruction 
The monastery was razed to ground at some point between 1997 and November 11, 2009, as documented by investigation of the Caucasus Heritage Watch.

References 

Ruins in Azerbaijan
Armenian churches in Azerbaijan